Section 25 of the Constitution Act, 1867 is a repealed provision of the Constitution of Canada relating to the appointment of the first members of the Senate of Canada in 1867.

The Constitution Act, 1867 is the constitutional statute which established Canada.  Originally named the British North America Act, 1867, the Act continues to be the foundational statute for the Constitution of Canada, although it has been amended many times since 1867.  It is now recognised as part of the supreme law of Canada.

Constitution Act, 1867

The Constitution Act, 1867 is part of the Constitution of Canada and thus part of the supreme law of Canada.  It was the product of extensive negotiations by the governments of the British North American provinces in the 1860s. The Act sets out the constitutional framework of Canada, including the structure of the federal government and the powers of the federal government and the provinces.  Originally enacted in 1867 by the British Parliament under the name the British North America Act, 1867, in 1982 the Act was brought under full Canadian control through the Patriation of the Constitution, and was renamed the Constitution Act, 1867.  Since Patriation the Act can only be amended in Canada, under the amending formula set out in the Constitution Act, 1982.

Repealed text of section 25 

Section 25 read:

Section 25 was found in Part IV of the Constitution Act, 1867, dealing with the legislative power of the federal government.  It was repealed in 1893 by the Statute Law Revision Act 1893, a statute of the British Parliament.

Purpose and interpretation

The Senate of Canada is an appointed body, not elected.  Section 25 of the Act ensured that the Senate would be fully functional when the Constitution Act, 1867 came into force on July 1, 1867, by naming the initial senators in the royal proclamation bringing the Act into force.  From that point on, senators have been appointed by the Governor General under section 24 of the Act, on the advice of the federal Cabinet.

Prior to Confederation, the Province of Canada, New Brunswick and Nova Scotia all had bicameral parliaments, with the upper house termed the Legislative Council.  The Quebec Resolutions proposed that the senators would initially be nominated by the provincial governments, and the seats would be offered to current members of the provincial legislative councils, in proportion to the representation of the government and opposition members in each legislative council, so that "all political parties may as nearly as possible be fairly represented."  This principle was not expressly included in the Act itself, but was implemented in the initial appointments to the Senate, which were largely drawn from the provincial legislative councils.  Section 127 of the Act provided the mechanism for offers to be made to members of the legislative councils.

Senators appointed under the provision

The following were the senators appointed under section 25, effective July 1, 1867.  They were all named in the Royal Proclamation which brought the Constitution Act, 1867 into force.

Prior to Confederation, the Legislative Council of the Province of Canada was composed of 48 members, 24 from Canada East and 24 from Canada West.  All of the members of the Legislative Council as of 1867 were named to the Senate in the list in the Royal Proclamation.  The majority of the senators appointed from New Brunswick and Nova Scotia were from the legislative councils of those two provinces, but some of the appointments were members of the legislative assemblies.  Members of the legislative councils of New Brunswick and Nova Scotia who accepted a senate position automatically gave up their position in the legislative council, as provided by section 127 of the Act.

Three nominees declined the position:
 Sir Narcisse Fortunat Belleau of Quebec, who instead was appointed the first Lieutenant Governor of Quebec on July 1, 1867;
 Edward Barron Chandler of New Brunswick, who declined based on his advanced age and disinclination to seek a new public office; and
 William Todd of New Brunswick, who declined as he did not wish to move to Ottawa.

Ontario

Quebec

Nova Scotia

New Brunswick

Repeal

Section 25 was repealed by the British Parliament in 1893, in the Statute Law Revision Act 1893. The law was of a "housekeeping" nature, repealing statutory provisions which no longer had any purpose. Since the initial senators had been appointed in 1867, section 25 was no longer needed and was repealed.

Related provisions
The Proclamation of the Constitution Act, 1867 named the initial group of senators appointed under this provision.

Section 24 of the Act provides for the appointment of senators after the initial appointments under this section.

Section 127 of the Act set out the process for appointments of senators from the Legislative Councils of the original provinces.

References 

Constitution of Canada
Canadian Confederation
Federalism in Canada